Udaipur is a major city in Rajasthan, India.

Udaipur may also refer to:

 Udaipur State, a princely state with its capital at the Udaipur city
 Udaipur, Madhya Pradesh, a town and historic site in central India
 Chhota Udaipur, a municipality in the Vadodara district of Gujarat, India
 Udaipur, a town in the Lahaul and Spiti of Himachal Pradesh, India
 Udaipur district, a district in the Rajasthan state of India
 Udaipur Division, an administrative division of the Rajasthan state in India
 Udaipur Kingdom also known as Mewar, a Rajput kingdom of Rajasthan, India
 Udaipur, Tripura, a town in the South Tripura district of Tripura, India
 Udaipur railway station
 Udaipur (horse), a Thoroughbred racehorse

See also 
 Udaipur city (disambiguation)
 Udayapur (disambiguation)